The siege of Sofia took place in 1382 or 1385 during the course of the Bulgarian–Ottoman wars. Unable to defend his country from the Ottomans, in 1373 the Bulgarian emperor Ivan Shishman agreed to become an Ottoman vassal and to marry his sister Kera Tamara to their sultan Murad I, while the Ottomans were to return some conquered fortresses. Despite the peace, in the beginning of the 1380s the Ottomans resumed their campaigns and besieged the important city of Sofia which controlled major communication routes to Serbia and Macedonia. There are little records about the siege. After the futile attempts to storm the city, the Ottoman commander Lala Shahin Pasha considered to abandon the siege. However, a Bulgarian renegate managed to lure the city governor ban Yanuka out of the fortress to hunt and the Turks captured him. Leaderless, the Bulgarians surrendered. The city walls were destroyed and an Ottoman garrison was installed. With the way to the north-west cleared, the Ottomans pressed further and captured Pirot and Niš in 1386, thus wedging between Bulgaria and Serbia.

Citations

Sources
 

Sieges involving the Second Bulgarian Empire
Sieges involving the Ottoman Empire
1385 in Europe
Conflicts in 1385
14th century in Bulgaria
History of Sofia
1385 in the Ottoman Empire
Bulgarian–Ottoman wars
Events in Sofia